Frederick Collins (25 February 1881 – 4 October 1917) was an Australian cricketer. He played 37 first-class cricket matches for Victoria between 1899 and 1909. He was killed in action during World War I at Broodseinde.

See also
 List of Victoria first-class cricketers

References

External links
 

1881 births
1917 deaths
Australian cricketers
Victoria cricketers
Cricketers from Melbourne
Australian military personnel killed in World War I